This Is the Place for a Song or This Is the Place for a Song: A Melbourne Celebration of World Music is a compilation album by various Australian artists, released in May 2005. It consists of 14 cover versions of Melbourne-associated tracks in different styles, with some in different languages. The album was organised by Paul Stewart and Gil Santos (from the Dili Allstars) and it was created to raise awareness of Melbourne's Immigration Museum and was sponsored by the Victorian Multicultural Commission with a grant of $10,000. At the ARIA Music Awards of 2005 it received a nomination for Best World Music Album.

Track listing

References

2005 compilation albums